Richard Charles Lascelles Carr (born 22 July 1938) is a former director of Arsenal Holdings PLC ("Arsenal") and a former director and board member of Arsenal Football Club, which is a wholly owned subsidiary of Arsenal Holdings PLC. He held 2,722 shares (4.6%) in Arsenal till May 2008, when he sold them to Stan Kroenke.

He is the grandson of former Arsenal Chairman Sir Bracewell Smith through his mother Eileen Smith. His father Henry Lascelles Carr played cricket for Glamorgan served in the RAF in the Second World War and died in 1943. He has a wife, Edda, whom he married in 1960; their daughter, Sue Carr is a High Court judge. His half-sister, Lady Sarah Phipps-Bagge, held 2% of the shares in the club. His brother Clive Carr is the football club's former Life Vice-President.

Richard Carr has formerly held directorships of Lee Yang Enterprise Limited, the Park Lane Hotel Ltd and Tymals Investments Ltd. Tymals Investments Ltd was dissolved in 1999, the other director was fellow former Arsenal board member Nina Bracewell-Smith.

References

Arsenal F.C. directors and chairmen
British businesspeople
1938 births
Living people